Rutland Senior Secondary School (RSS) is part of School District 23 Central Okanagan (SD#23) in Kelowna, British Columbia. It is located off Rutland Road, sharing a lot with Rutland Middle School (RMS). It is a comprehensive high school offering a wide array of academic programs including Advanced Placement (AP), British Columbia Institute of Technology (BCIT) dual credit courses, and the Secondary School Apprenticeship program.

Additional facts
Built in 1972 on the current site.  Expansion in 2000 and 2004/5.
Programs - academic, vocational, advanced placement, apprenticeship programs, OUC dual credit, & BCIT programs

Academics & Provincial Ranking 
Rutland Secondary scored a 6.1 ranking from the Fraser Institute in 2020.  RSS was ranked 119/252 high schools in BC in 2020.

References

External links
Rutland Senior Secondary School
Rutland Middle School

High schools in Kelowna
Schools in the Okanagan
Educational institutions established in 1952
1952 establishments in British Columbia